This is a list of the Secretaries-General of the East African Community since the re-established East African Community, after the EAC Treaty 1999 came into force in July 2000. Since then there have been five secretaries-general appointed by the relevant heads of state. Both the secretary-general position and the chairman position is appointed on a rotational basis by the respective partner states. The secretary-general has to be a deputy secretary-general to be appointed and at a time, there are four deputy secretaries in place.

List of Secretaries-General

Deputy secretary-general 
A deputy secretary-general is appointed by the summit on a three-year term renewable once. Each nation will have one deputy secretary-general except the nation at which the secretary-general hails from.

See also 
 East African Community

References

External links 

East African Community officials